Tjeldsund is a municipality in Troms og Finnmark county, Norway. The southwestern part of the municipality is part of the traditional district of Ofoten and the rest of the municipality is part of Central Hålogaland. The administrative centre of the municipality is the village of Evenskjer. Other important villages include Fjelldal, Myklebostad, Grovfjord, Renså, Sandstrand, Tovik, and Ramsund. Norges Brannskole (Norway's education and training center for firemen) is situated in Fjelldal. Marinejegerkommandoen is based south of Ramsund.

The  municipality is the 139th largest by area out of the 356 municipalities in Norway. Tjeldsund is the 197th most populous municipality in Norway with a population of 4,201.

General information

The municipality of Tjeldsund was established on 1 January 1909 when it was separated from the large Lødingen Municipality. Tjeldsund encompassed the eastern part of Lødingen prior to the division. Initially, Tjeldsund had a population of 1,404.

During the 1960s, there were many municipal mergers across Norway due to the work of the Schei Committee. On 1 January 1964, the western part of the island of Tjeldøya (population: 297) was transferred to Tjeldsund Municipality from Lødingen Municipality, uniting the whole island within the same municipality. On the same date, the unpopulated Ramnes area of Evenes Municipality was also transferred to Tjeldsund Municipality.

On 1 January 2020, the municipality merged with the neighboring Skånland Municipality and at the same time the new municipality became a part of the newly formed Troms og Finnmark county (prior to the merger, Skånland was located in the old Troms county and Tjeldsund was in Nordland county).

Name
The municipality is named after the Tjeldsundet strait which runs between the islands of Tjeldøya and Hinnøya. The first element is the (uncompounded) Old Norse name of the island of Tjeldøya ( or ). The name of the island is probably derived from the word  which means "tent" or the similar word  which means "oystercatcher" (Haematopus ostralegus).

Coat of arms
The coat of arms was granted on 29 June 1990. The official blazon is "Argent, a cross of St. Anthony azure". This means the arms have a field (background) that has a tincture of argent which means it is commonly colored white, but if it is made out of metal, then silver is used. The charge is a Cross of Saint Anthony which has a tincture of azure. The blue color in the field symbolizes the importance of the sea. The cross is a canting of the letter T, the first letter of the name Tjeldsund. The blue cross shape also stands for the confluence of the Tjeldsundet and Ramsundet straits which run between the mainland and the islands of Tjeldøya and Hinnøya. The arms were designed by Arvid Sveen.

Churches
The Church of Norway has four parishes within the municipality of Tjeldsund. It is part of the Trondenes prosti (deanery) in the Diocese of Nord-Hålogaland.

Geography

Since 1 January 2020, Tjeldsund is located in Troms og Finnmark county on the border with Nordland county to the south and west (prior to that time, Tjeldsund was smaller, and located in Nordland county). Tjeldsund is partially located on the island of Tjeldøya which is surrounded by the Ofotfjorden on the south; the Tjeldsundet strait to the west, north, and east; and the Ramsundet strait to the east. 

The island is connected to the mainland by the Ramsund Bridge. The rest of the municipality is on the mainland to the east of Tjeldøya plus a small area on the island of Hinnøya to the north of Tjeldøya, and the Skånland area on the mainland to the northeast. The municipalities of Evenes (in Nordland) and Gratangen (in Troms og Finnmark) lie to the east of Tjeldsund; Harstad, Kvæfjord, and Ibestad (in Troms og Finnmark) lie to the north; Lødingen lies to the west, and Narvik lies to the south. 

The largest lake in the municipality is Skoddebergvatnet on the mainland.

Climate

Government
All municipalities in Norway, including Tjeldsund, are responsible for primary education (through 10th grade), outpatient health services, senior citizen services, unemployment and other social services, zoning, economic development, and municipal roads. The municipality is governed by a municipal council of elected representatives, which in turn elect a mayor.  The municipality falls under the Ofoten District Court and the Hålogaland Court of Appeal.

Municipal council
The municipal council of Tjeldsund is made up of 21 representatives that are elected to four year terms. The party breakdown of the council is as follows:

Mayors
The mayors of Tjeldsund (incomplete list):

1999-2015: Bjørnar O. Pettersen (H)
2015-2019: Liv Kristin Johnsen (H)
2019–present: Helene Berg Nilsen (Ap)

Notable people 
 Bjarne Berg-Sæther (1919 in Tjeldsund – 2009), a Norwegian politician, Mayor of Sandtorg 1947–1963, and Mayor of Harstad 1963-1967

References

External links

Municipal fact sheet from Statistics Norway 

 
Municipalities of Troms og Finnmark
Populated places of Arctic Norway
1909 establishments in Norway